Gheorghe Cozorici (16 July 1933 – 18 December 1993) was a Romanian actor. He appeared in more than thirty films from 1956 to 1989.

Filmography

References

External links 

1933 births
1993 deaths
Romanian male film actors